Dan Anyiam Stadium is a Nigerian multi-purpose stadium located in Owerri, Imo State.

History
Located in the centre of Owerri, Imo State's capital, the capital of Imo State, the stadium is named after Daniel Anyiam, vice-captain of the first Nigeria national football team.

In 2019, the Imo State governor Emeka Ihedioha during his "Rebuild Imo Project" awarded contracts for the renovation and rehabilitation of the Dan Anyiam Stadium alongside some other projects.

Usage
It is used mostly for association-football matches and is the home stadium of Heartland F.C.

Capacity
The stadium has a capacity of 10,000 people.

See also

List of association football stadiums by country
List of stadiums

References

External links
Stadium Website, archived from February 2011.

Event venues with year of establishment missing
21st century in Nigeria
Sports venues completed in the 21st century
Football venues in Nigeria
Multi-purpose stadiums in Nigeria
Owerri
Year of establishment missing
21st-century architecture in Nigeria